"Shut Up... and Forget About It" is the debut solo single by English singer and songwriter Dane Bowers, released as the lead single from his debut album, Facing the Crowd (2001). A top 10 hit, the song peaked at No. 9 on the UK Singles Chart in early March 2001. The song was produced by the American production duo the Underdogs.

Track listing
CD maxi-single
 "Shut Up... and Forget About It" (Original Version) - 3:09
 "Shut Up... and Forget About It" (El-B Vocal Mix) - 5:04
 "Shut Up... and Forget About It" (G4orce Amnesia Vocal Mix) - 6:25

UK 12" vinyl
A1. "Shut Up... and Forget About It" (El-B Vocal Mix) - 5:04
A2. "Shut Up... and Forget About It" (El-B Dub) - 5:10
B. "Shut Up... and Forget About It" (G4orce Amnesia Vocal Mix) - 6:25

References

2000 songs
2001 debut singles
Dane Bowers songs
Songs written by Damon Thomas (record producer)
Songs written by Harvey Mason Jr.
Song recordings produced by the Underdogs (production team)
Arista Records singles